Vemulawada may refer to any one of the following places in India:

Vemulawada, Rajanna Sircilla district, a temple town in Rajanna Sircilla district of Telangana, India
Chalukyas of Vemulavada, medieval Indian dynasty based in the town
Raja Rajeswara Temple, Vemulawada
Vemulawada, East Godavari district, a temple town in East Godavari district of Andhra Pradesh, India
Vemulawada Bheemakavi, 11th-century Indian poet in Telugu
Vemulawada Bheemakavi (film), 1976 Indian film about him